In mathematics, the Labs septic surface is a degree-7 (septic) nodal surface with 99 nodes found by .

See also

Barth surface
Endrass surface
Sarti surface
Togliatti surface

References

External links

Algebraic surfaces